"Sunshine After the Rain" is a song originally written and recorded by Ellie Greenwich in 1968, titled as "The Sunshine After the Rain" and released on her album Composes, Produces and Sings. It was covered by Elkie Brooks in 1977 and Berri in 1994.

Elkie Brooks version

Brooks' version was released as a single in 1977 and reached number 10 on the UK Singles Chart. The song appears as the fourth track on her 1977 album Two Days Away.

Track listings
UK 7" single

Charts

Weekly charts

Year-end charts

Berri version

In 1994, English singer Berri recorded her version. It contains an interpolation of "I Feel Love" by Donna Summer.

"Sunshine After the Rain" was released twice. During its first release, it was credited as "New Atlantic/U4EA featuring Berri" and reached number 26 on the UK Singles Chart in December 1994. A re-release in 1995 fared somewhat better, peaking at number four on the UK Singles Chart in September, this time credited solely as Berri. The re-release also became a hit in Australia, peaking at number 12 on the ARIA Singles Chart, and in Iceland and Ireland, reaching number 11 in both countries.

Critical reception
Larry Flick from Billboard viewed songs like "Sunshine After the Rain" as "such juicy European morsels", adding that it "[has] the infectious hooks and tidy production required for a successful crossover to top 40 waters." James Hamilton from British magazine Music Weeks RM Dance Update described it as a "plaintive anthemic galloping remake".

Track listings
 1994 CD single as New Atlantic/U4EA featuring Berri "The Sunshine After the Rain" (Two Cowboys 7" edit) — 3:31
 "The Sunshine After the Rain" (New Atlantic mix) — 6:31
 "The Sunshine After the Rain" (original U4EA breakbeat mix) — 5:24
 "The Sunshine After the Rain" (Two Cowboys 12" mix) — 4:29
 "The Sunshine After the Rain" (Tall Paul remix) — 6:34

 1995 CD single as Berri'
 "The Sunshine After the Rain" (Two Cowboys club edit) — 3:30
 "The Sunshine After the Rain" (Two Cowboys club mix) — 4:27
 "The Sunshine After the Rain" (Dancin' Divaz club mix) — 8:00
 "The Sunshine After the Rain" (Dancin' Divaz rhythm mix) — 6:31

Charts and certifications

Weekly charts

Year-end charts

Certifications

"Rainbow in the Sky"
In 1995, DJ Paul Elstak produced a happy hardcore track titled "Rainbow in the Sky". The "K&A Blast" versions very closely resemble the Berri version of "Sunshine After the Rain". "Rainbow in the Sky" was released in the UK on 12" vinyl and CD. The "Rainbow in the Sky" CD single also contained Paul Elstak's single, "Luv U More".

Charts

Weekly charts

Year-end charts

References

External links
 Lyrics of this song
 

1968 songs
1977 singles
1994 singles
1995 singles
A&M Records singles
Elkie Brooks songs
Songs written by Ellie Greenwich